Edward James Whitten Sr. OAM (27 July 1933 – 17 August 1995) was an Australian rules footballer who played for the Footscray Football Club in the Victorian Football League (VFL).

Born and raised into a working-class family in Footscray, Whitten debuted for the Bulldogs in 1951, quickly becoming one of the league's best key position players, either at centre half-forward or centre half-back. In 1954 he won his first of five club best and fairest awards and earned a spot in the All-Australian team, the same year that Footscray won its first VFL/AFL premiership. Appointed as captain-coach in 1957, he developed a successful but controversial game plan centred around the since-outlawed flick pass, and in 1961 led the club to its second grand final appearance, losing to Hawthorn. In 1967, he broke Arthur Olliver's club record of 271 senior games, and retired from playing after establishing a league record of 321 games in 1970.

Whitten was also passionate about interstate football and made 29 appearances for Victoria, and was a leading promoter of State of Origin along with his South Australian sparring partner and friend Neil "Knuckles" Kerley. After retiring, Whitten became a popular football panellist and commentator. He was diagnosed with prostate cancer in 1991, and in 1995, frail and in the final stages of the disease, received a farewell lap of honour during a State of Origin match at the Melbourne Cricket Ground, later ranked as football's most unforgettable moment.

Football writers Russell Holmesby and Jim Main described Whitten as a "prodigious kick, a flawless mark" and as having unequalled "ground and hand skills". Nicknamed "Mr. Football", he was a folk hero in Melbourne's working class western suburbs, admired not only for his footballing abilities, but his showmanship and larrikin streak. He was inducted into the Sport Australia Hall of Fame in 1985 and elevated to Legend status in 1995. During the AFL's Centenary Year celebrations in 1996, he was one of twelve inaugural Legends inducted into the Australian Football Hall of Fame, and was voted captain and centre half-back in the AFL's Team of the Century. Western Oval, Footscray's home ground, was renamed Whitten Oval in his honour. His enthusiasm for State of Origin is marked by the E. J. Whitten Legends Game, a charity match held annually since 1995.

Early days

Whitten grew up in the western suburbs of Braybrook and Footscray in Melbourne. As a youth, Whitten played for Braybrook on Saturdays and Collingwood Amateurs on Sundays; he was urged by the Collingwood Amateurs coach Charlie Utting (a former Collingwood VFL star) to try out for the Collingwood team but was told later to come back in a few years after building up body strength. Within 12 months he was playing for Footscray, the team he had always supported.

Football career

1951–53: Making a name
Whitten made his senior VFL debut in Round 1 of the 1951 VFL season against  at Punt Road Oval and joined a special group of players who scored a goal with his first kick. During the match, Don "Mopsy" Fraser, a notoriously volatile defender for Richmond, knocked Whitten out late in the third quarter. Whitten later said that Fraser did him a favour that day, hardening his attitude and making him realise that League football was a no-nonsense game that only the toughest could succeed at. 
In Round 5 against  at the Western Oval, Whitten kicked two goals in a 28-point win, but suffered a serious injury to his left ankle. Although his injury responded quickly to treatment, Whitten would not play again until Round 8 against .

In August, Whitten was called up for National Service and sent to Puckapunyal in central Victoria. When Footscray qualified for the finals, club officials tried to obtain special leave for Whitten to play in the First Semi-Final against . The Army refused to grant permission, but a last-minute intervention by the Prime Minister Robert Menzies allowed Whitten to return to Melbourne for the match. Unfortunately, Footscray lost a hard-fought game by eight points.

1954: Premiership glory

After finally breaking their finals hoodoo the previous year, Footscray looked primed and ready to challenge for the VFL Premiership in 1954.
He was a key member of Footscray's 1954 VFL Premiership victory, the club's only premiership until 2016.

1955–56: Post-Premiership decline
After their magnificent Grand Final victory, many expected Footscray to become a powerhouse of Victorian football. But the club faded away, even though Whitten continued to excel.

1957–60: Elevated to captain-coach
With superb all-round skills, Whitten had the extraordinary talent of being able to kick equally well with his right and left foot. On one occasion, playing against Richmond at Footscray, in the mid-1960s, he broke out of the ruck, to the left, from a centre bounce, ran two paces to balance himself, and kicked a left-foot torpedo kick for a goal. The ball was returned to the centre, bounced, and Whitten burst out of the pack, to the right, ran three paces and kicked a right-foot torpedo kick for a goal.

1961: A second crack at glory
One of the best exponents of the "flick pass", which was eventually banned, Whitten was one of few football players to have the ability to play any position on the field. He was regarded by his contemporaries in the 1950s and 1960s as the greatest naturally talented player of his era;

1962–66: State vs Club
Over the course of his playing career, Whitten experienced conflict with the Footscray committee, none more dramatic than at the end of the 1966 VFL season, when he came close to joining  after he was replaced as coach. When Footscray refused the clearance, Whitten threatened to retire, and the matter was only resolved when former teammate Jack Collins took over as club president and convinced Whitten to return and play under his former coach Charlie Sutton.

1967–70: Final years
With the demands of coaching and playing beginning to take a toll on his ageing body, Whitten was allowed by the Footscray committee to play four games in 1970 to break Dick Reynolds' longstanding VFL record of 320 games before he retired as a player. His 321st and final game was against Hawthorn at the Western Oval, a game which Footscray won by three points. He continued to coach Footscray until the end of the 1971 season.

He coached Williamstown in the 1975 VFA season.

Off the field
As well as being a star player (he appeared for Victoria on 29 occasions), Whitten was a passionate promoter of the game – in particular the State of Origin competition, representing and captaining "The Big V" on many occasions. He was also chairman of selectors for the state team after retiring from playing football. He was a key promotional tool for the series, often featured promoting the Victorian team with his saying "Stick it right up 'em", and had a profound impact on the concept during his time being associated. A notable example of this, was before the 1983 game between Victoria and Western Australia, which was for the Australian Football Championships, a new format for the competition, in which Victoria had previously lost to South Australia, and was on verge for the first time in history of losing all of its interstate matches in a year.  On the bus ride to the ground Whitten sternly walked down the aisle, and handed out cards which had the Victorian theme song, which hadn't been sung in at least 10 years.  And then began to start singing the song, with the players joining in, with soon being sung with feverish enthusiasm, with it being described the players had a tone in there voice of let's get these little bastards. He also inspired many players during his time as a selector including Paul Roos, Danny Frawley and Jim Stynes.

Whitten once famously said: Years ago you had to crawl over cut glass to get one (i.e. a state guernsey), He worked as a football commentator on television throughout the 1970s and as a radio commentator in the latter part of his life.

Mike Brady wrote a song about him called, "It all sounds like football to me". Ted Whitten is heard answering questions humorously on the song.

Post-career honours
In 1992, Whitten was awarded the Medal of the Order of Australia (OAM) for his services to Australian football.

In 1996, he was among the first batch of inductees to the Australian Football Hall of Fame, and was one of the twelve players immediately elevated to Legend status. He was selected as Captain of the AFL Team of the Century. In 2009 The Australian nominated Whitten as one of the 25 greatest footballers never to win a Brownlow medal.

Whitten is one of only three Australian rules footballers recognised as a Legend of Australian Sport in the Sport Australia Hall of Fame, alongside Ron Barassi and Leigh Matthews.

Death and legacy

In 1995, Whitten went public with the announcement that he was suffering from prostate cancer. On 17 June he made his final public appearance at the MCG before the State of Origin match between Victoria and South Australia. Suffering from blindness due to a stroke, Whitten was driven in a white convertible for a lap of honour around the MCG, accompanied by his son and three grandchildren while Mariah Carey's cover of the song "Hero" was played on the PA system. He received a standing ovation from the crowd. This event was polled as the most memorable football event by the Melbourne newspaper The Age, and the moment is captured in Jamie Cooper's painting the Game That Made Australia, commissioned by the AFL in 2008 to celebrate the 150th anniversary of the sport.

Whitten died from cancer on 17 August 1995. His death, while imminent, came as a shock to the football community. News of Whitten's passing was broken live on an episode of The Footy Show. Producer Harvey Silver learned of Whitten's death early in the recording of the episode, but did not break the news to host Eddie McGuire and panellists Sam Newman, Wayne Schwass, Garry Lyon and Doug Hawkins until during the final commercial break of the episode. Hawkins in particular, who was a close friend of Whitten, was emotionally distressed upon hearing the news, and could only manage to say "He was a great man, Teddy." Newman, also a close friend of Whitten, told host Eddie McGuire after the news was broken to the studio audience and viewers: "They say the show must go on, but if we'd known that when we started, the show wouldn't have gone on." The usual studio audience applause that came with the conclusion of the episode was replaced with a silent fade to the Footy Show motif.

Writing for The Age at the end of that year, Les Carlyon reflected on Whitten's impact on communities in the western suburbs of Melbourne:

Such was Whitten's popularity, he was given a nationally televised state funeral, had a bridge named for him (EJ Whitten Bridge on the Western Ring Road) and a statue erected at the Bulldogs' former home ground, Whitten (Western) Oval in Footscray, which was also renamed in his honour.

After Whitten's death, his son, Ted Whitten Jr. instituted the EJ Whitten Legends Game in the memory of his father. The game is a charity match to raise money for prostate cancer research.

Ted Whitten currently rests at Altona Memorial Park in Melbourne's west.

Year-by-year statistics
Source

References

External links
 
 
 

1933 births
1995 deaths
Australian Football Hall of Fame inductees
People from Footscray, Victoria
Australian rules football commentators
Charles Sutton Medal winners
Deaths from prostate cancer
Deaths from cancer in Victoria (Australia)
Western Bulldogs coaches
Western Bulldogs players
Western Bulldogs Premiership players
All-Australians (1953–1988)
Australian rules footballers from Melbourne
Braybrook Football Club players
Williamstown Football Club coaches
One-time VFL/AFL Premiership players
Sport Australia Hall of Fame inductees
Recipients of the Medal of the Order of Australia